The 2010 Arkansas State Red Wolves football team represented Arkansas State University as a member of the Sun Belt Conference during the 2010 NCAA Division I FBS football season. Led by Steve Roberts in his ninth and final season as head coach, the Red Wolves compiled an overall record of 4–8 with a mark of 4–4 in conference play, tying for fourth place in the Sun Belt. Arkansas State played home games at ASU Stadium in Jonesboro, Arkansas. Roberts was fired at the end of the season.

Schedule

NFL Draft
7th round, 214th overall pick by the Houston Texans—Sr. OT Derek Newton

References

Arkansas State
Arkansas State Red Wolves football seasons
Arkansas State Red Wolves football